This is a list of notable people assassinated by the Janatha Vimukthi Peramuna (JVP). JVP is a Sri Lankan Marxist-Leninist, communist party which was involved in two armed uprisings against the ruling governments in 1971 (SLFP) and 1987–89 (UNP). Later it entered democratic politics by participating in the 1994 parliamentary election.

1971 JVP Insurrection
 Rex De Costa - Former commanding officer of the Ruhunu Regiment and a medical doctor in the Ceylon Defence Force during World War II, former Vice President of the World Veterans Federation
 Noel Weerakoon, CA - RMA Sandhurst and Ceylon Army cricketer

1987–89 JVP Insurrection

 K. Gunaratnam - businessman and movie director
 Amara Wellappuli -  Attorney-At-Law 
 Anura Daniel - United National Party MP for Kandy
 Chandratne Patuwathavithane - Academic & Former vice chancellor of University of Moratuwa
 D. C. Atukorala - A Chief Engineer attached to the Ports Authority, Sri Lanka  
 Daya Pathirana - Former leader of the Independent Students Union (ISU) of University of Colombo
 Daya Sepali Senadhira - United National Party MP for Karandeniya
 DIG Bennet Perera - Former Director Criminal Investigation Department of Sri Lanka.
 DIG Terrance Perera - Former  director of the counter subversive division, Sri Lanka Police
 Esmie Amarasiri - Wife of M. S. Amarasiri, former Chief Minister, Southern Provincial Council, Sri Lanka 
 G. V. S. de Silva - Former district minister and United National Party MP for Habaraduwa
 Gamini Medagedera - attorney at law, English teacher and secretary of Sri Lanka communist party polonnaruwa
 Gladys Jayawardene - Former Chairman of State Pharmaceutical Corporation of Sri Lanka.
 Harsha Abeywardena - Former chairman of the United National Party
 Jinadasa Weerasinghe - United National Party MP for Tangalle
 K. Amaratunge - Chief News Editor, Sri Lanka Rupavahini Corporation
 L. W. Panditha - Member of Sri Lankan communist Party and Trade unionist
 Lesley Ranagala - United National Party MP for Borella
 Leslie Yatanwala - Attorney-At-Law
 Lionel Jayatilake - Former minister and United National Party MP
 Merrill Kariyawasam - United National Party MP for Agalawatte
 Nandalal Fernando Former General Secretary of United National Party
 Premakeerthi de Alwis- Famous Sri Lankan radio and television broadcaster and lyricist.
 Rev. Fr. Michael Paul Rodrigo, OMI - Catholic priest
 Sagarika Gomes - Artist and TV newscaster.
 Stanley Wijesundera - Sri Lankan academic and a Professor of Chemistry, the first Vice Chancellor of the University of Colombo and former the Chairman of the Association of Commonwealth Universities
 Thevis Guruge - Distinguished broadcaster with Radio Ceylon and subsequently the Sri Lanka Broadcasting Corporation. First Sinhala Announcer of the Radio Ceylon 
 Ven. Kotikawatte Saddhatissa Thera - Famous Buddhist monk
 Ven. Pohaddaramulle Premaloka Thero - Buddhist monk
 Vijaya Kumaranatunga - Popular Sri Lankan film actor and politician, founder of Sri Lanka Mahajana Party (SLMP)
 W. M. G. T. Banda - Former Minister of Buddhist Affairs and United National Party MP for Galagedara

Notes

References 

Janatha Vimukthi Peramuna
Assassinated Sri Lankan people
Sri Lanka